Neyrazh may refer to:
 Neyrazh-e Olya
 Neyrazh-e Sofla